The 1971–72 season was Manchester United's 70th season in the Football League, and their 27th consecutive season in the top division of English football. In a pre-season competition United participated in the Watney Cup, which was contested by the teams that had scored the most goals in each of the four divisions of the Football League the previous season who had not been promoted or admitted to one of the European competitions.

Before the beginning of the season, on 8 June 1971, Frank O'Farrell was appointed as United manager, more than five months after Wilf McGuinness had been sacked. Sir Matt Busby had returned to the role of manager until the end of the season before returning to his role of director.

Due to Manchester United being banned from playing their first two home matches in Old Trafford, after hooligans had thrown knives into the away section at a match at the end of the previous season, their opening "home" games were played at Anfield and the Victoria Ground.

O'Farrell's first season as United managed started well, and they were top of the league by Christmas. However, a run of seven successive league defeats after the turn of 1972 dragged them down the table. In January and February 1972, United conceded 16 goals, including 5 at Elland Road. O'Farrell attempted to shore up the leaky defence with the signing of Martin Buchan from Aberdeen for a (then) club record fee of £125,000. United never recovered their early season form and they could only manage an eighth-place finish.

Watney Cup

First Division

FA Cup

League Cup

Squad statistics

References

Manchester United F.C. seasons
Manchester United